Through the Many Winters, A Christmas Album is a 2005 Christmas album by Michael McDonald. It was one of the first in the longstanding series of annual seasonal albums commissioned and retailed by Hallmark Cards to have reliable sales figures published, despite being sold through Hallmark's 4,000 card franchise shops, rather than through normal record shops in the Billboard chart system. The album was released three weeks before Thanksgiving, and reached Gold status (500,000 copies sold) two weeks after its release. At the time of its release, the album was priced at $7.95 with a purchase of three Hallmark cards.

Track listing
"Silent Night" - 4:47
"O Holy Night" - 5:06
"Come, O Come Emanuel/What Month Was Jesus Born" - 4:10
"Deck The Halls/Jingle Bells" - 2:50
"O Tannenbaum"	 - 1:55
"Wexford Carol" - 5:01
"God Rest Ye Merry Gentlemen" - 3:35
"Through The Many Winters" (Amy Holland / Michael McDonald) - 6:51
"Christmas On The Bayou" (McDonald / Grady Walker / Shannon Forrest) - 3:41
"Auld Lang Syne/O Tannenbaum (Reprise)" - 2:26

Personnel 
 Michael McDonald – lead vocals, acoustic piano, synthesizers, Hammond B3 organ, dulcimer, accordion, acoustic guitar, bass
 Pat Coil – keyboards (1, 2, 3, 8), synthesizers (1, 2, 3, 8), acoustic piano (1, 2, 3, 8), Hammond B3 organ (1, 2, 3, 8), string arrangements (1, 2)
 Josh Henson – acoustic and electric guitars (3, 4, 6, 7), bass (6)
 Russell Bono – additional electric guitar (3), backing vocals (3)
 Tom Hemby – nylon guitar (8)
 Shannon Forrest – drums, programming
 Conni Ellisor – strings (1, 2)
 Anthony LaMarchina – strings (1, 2)
 Mark Douthit – tenor saxophone (2, 3, 10), soprano saxophone (5)
 Stuart Duncan – fiddle (6, 9)
 Pat Bergeson – harmonica (8)
 Daniel Moore II – backing vocals (3, 7)
 Drea Rheneé – backing vocals (3, 7)
 Kabanya Vinson – backing vocals (3, 7)
 Amy Holland – lead and backing vocals (6)

Production
 Producers – Michael McDonald, Shannon Forrest and Grady Walker.
 Production Coordination – Kathy Walker
 Engineer – Shannon Forrest
 Second Engineer – Grady Walker
 Recorded and Mixed at Bingham Bend (Leiper's Fork, TN).
 Mastered by Jim DeMain at Yes Master (Nashville, TN).
 Management – Joel Hoffner and Ken Levitan at Vector Management.

References

Michael McDonald (musician) albums
2005 Christmas albums